György Szilágyi (4 July 1921 – 30 September 1992), was a Hungarian chess International Master (1956), Chess Olympiad team bronze winner (1956).

Biography
Szilágyi's first chess win was in 1937, winning the Hungarian Team Chess Championship with his team MTK. He participated twelve times in the Hungarian Chess Championship, with his best performances being 3rd and 4th place in 1950 and 1955, respectively. He was also successful in the Budapest City Chess Championship, winning 1st place in 1961, 3rd place in 1972, and 2nd place in 1973. Szilágyi won many international chess tournaments, including tournaments in Amsterdam (1965), Paris (1969) and Primorsko (1975).

György Szilágyi played for Hungary in the Chess Olympiads: In 1956, at the fourth board in the 12th Chess Olympiad in Moscow his team won the bronze medal. He was awarded the FIDE International Master (IM) title the same year.

References

External links

György Szilágyi chess games at 365chess.com

1921 births
1992 deaths
Sportspeople from Budapest
Hungarian chess players
Chess International Masters
Chess Olympiad competitors
20th-century chess players